Lawrenceville High School is a 9th–12th grade high school located in Lawrenceville, Illinois.

Lawrenceville has won four state championships (1972, 1974, 1982, 1983) and as of 2012 has the state record for the longest winning streak of 68–0, accomplished during the 1982 and 1983 seasons.

Notable alumni
 Marty Simmons

References

External links
 Lawrenceville High School website
 Community Unit School District 20 website

Schools in Lawrence County, Illinois
Public high schools in Illinois